The 1926 Kansas Jayhawks football team represented the University of Kansas in the Missouri Valley Conference during the 1926 college football season. In their first season under head coach Franklin Cappon, the Jayhawks compiled a 2–6 record (1–5 against conference opponents), finished in ninth place in the conference, and were outscored by opponents by a combined total of 135 to 34. They played their home games at Memorial Stadium in Lawrence, Kansas. Harold Zuber was the team captain.

Schedule

References

Kansas
Kansas Jayhawks football seasons
Kansas Jayhawks football